William Edward Caswell (June 22, 1947 – September 11, 2001) was an American physicist who died during the September 11 attacks, as a passenger aboard American Airlines Flight 77, which was crashed into the Pentagon. Caswell did work in quantum gauge theory, most notably, his 1972 calculation of the beta function to two-loop accuracy. His pioneering work in the days of FORTRAN and punch cards demonstrated the potential of computer algebra.

Personal life and background
William Edward Caswell was born on June 22, 1947 in Boston, Massachusetts, the eldest of six children. He lived most of his life in Silver Spring, Maryland, residing there until his death. He and his wife, Jean, had a daughter.

Education
Caswell attended the University of Maryland and graduated Phi Beta Kappa in three years with a degree in physics in 1968. He then attended graduate school for physics at Princeton University. His work at Princeton was delayed when he was drafted into the Army during the Vietnam War, where he came to admire the drill sergeant to whom he was assigned for basic training. When Caswell resumed his studies at Princeton, he chose to work in elementary particle theory. He received his Ph.D. in Physics in January 1975, and subsequently did postdoctoral work at Stanford University and Brown University.

Career
With his thesis advisor Curtis Callan, Caswell embarked on an ambitious program for the summation of Feynman loops in order to calculate elementary particle properties. His thesis, published in 1974, was groundbreaking work that encouraged and shaped future research. To quote his obituary in Physics Today: "Today the interpretation of many experiments in high-energy physics requires multiloop quantum chromodynamics calculations, and Bill's result is a prime ingredient in every such calculation. It is also a critical ingredient in calculating the running of the coupling constants of the Standard Model's supersymmetric extensions, calculations that are interpreted these days as evidence for both grand unification and low-energy supersymmetry. Thus Bill's work is also crucial to our thinking about physics beyond the Standard Model."

Caswell did work in quantum gauge theory. His graduate career coincided with the synthesis of gauge symmetry and renormalization group ideas, in which he himself made several pioneering contributions, the highpoint of which was his 1972 calculation of the beta function to two-loop accuracy. According to Physics Today, this effort "required unusual courage and determination, since the calculation simultaneously features all the notorious subtleties of gauge invariance, overlapping divergences, and renormalization."

In the age of punchcards, FORTRAN and paper output, Caswell felt that pure hand calculation was excruciating to perform and impractical to check. Looking into the then-uncharted world of machine symbolic calculation, he adapted Tony Hearn's REDUCE program in order to graph out calculations. Today his work is utilized in the multiloop quantum chromodynamics calculations that are used in high-energy physics experiments.

Caswell and Peter Lepage did significant work in 1978 to develop new and powerful tools for dealing with bound states such as positronium and charmonium.

Caswell was an assistant professor at Brown University from 1977 to 1979, and an assistant professor at the University of Maryland from 1979 to 1983. In 1983, Caswell left academic work for a position as a civilian scientist in the Naval Surface Weapons Center, first at White Oak, Maryland, formerly the Naval Ordnance Laboratory. In 1985, he joined a major classified defense technology project and rose to a position of technical responsibility, directing a team of more than 100 scientists.

Death and legacy

Caswell was on American Airlines Flight 77 which was crashed into the Pentagon on September 11, 2001. 

At the National September 11 Memorial, he is memorialized at the South Pool, on Panel S-70. 

His parents were involved in the design of a memorial to 9/11 victims in Rockville, Maryland.

References

External links

 Caswell's thesis work, 1974
 Obituary in Physics Today
 Washington Post obituary
 National Pentagon Memorial 
 

1947 births
2001 deaths
20th-century American physicists
21st-century American physicists
American Airlines Flight 77
Brown University faculty
People from Silver Spring, Maryland
People murdered in Virginia
Princeton University alumni
Scientists from Maryland
Terrorism deaths in Virginia
United States Army personnel of the Vietnam War
United States Army soldiers
United States Navy civilians
University of Maryland, College Park alumni
University of Maryland, College Park faculty
Victims of the September 11 attacks